Raj Bhavan ("Government House") is the official residence of the governor of Odisha. It is located in the city of Bhubaneswar, Odisha.

History 
The construction of Raj Bhavan started on 1 January 1958 under the architect Shri Julius Vaz. The land area is about 88 acres.

The 11th governor of Odisha, Sri Y. N. Sukthankar, was the first governor to stay here. Since then it has been the official residence of the governor.

References

External links
 Official website of the Governor of Odisha

Governors' houses in India
Buildings and structures in Bhubaneswar
1958 establishments in Orissa
Houses completed in 1958
20th-century architecture in India